Bømlo (or Bømmeløy) is an island in Vestland county, Norway.  At , it is the largest island in the island municipality of Bømlo, lying just off the western coast of Norway.  The island sits at the northern entrance to the vast Hardangerfjorden, west of the Stokksundet strait, south of the Selbjørnsfjorden, and east of the North Sea.  In the 1800s, the Kulleseid Canal was built across a small isthmus in the central part of the island, giving a shortcut from the eastern side of the island to the western side of the island.

The large island of Stord lies just to the east and the smaller island of Moster lies to the southwest.  There are hundreds of other small islands surrounding Bømlo.  The island does have a permanent ferry-free road connection to the mainland via the Triangle Link:  the Spissøy Bridge, the Bømla Bridge, and then the Bømlafjord Tunnel.  The main settlements on the island include the villages of Svortland, Rubbestadneset, Foldrøyhamn, Langevåg and Melandsvågen.

The flat surface that makes up Bømlo is a strandflat. This strandflat formed at least partly through weathering 210 million years ago during the Triassic period.

See also
List of islands of Norway

References

Islands of Vestland
Bømlo